Llangunnor is a village and community located in Carmarthenshire, Wales.
It is the southern suburb of Carmarthen town and consists mainly of typical suburban housing which has expanded in recent years. It has a small shop, two chapels, a church and a Primary School. It is made up of the villages and hamlets of Nantycaws, Pensarn, Login and Pibwrlwyd.

Saint Ceinwr's church
The parish church of Saint Ceinwr is the resting place of David Charles the famous Welsh hymn-writer. The oldest part of the present church building dates possibly from the 14th century, But the site has probably been a holy place since the earliest years of Celtic Christianity. 
The church is a Grade II listed building.

The vicars of St Ceinwr's can be traced back to at least 1661 and are recorded on the Incumbent board inside the church.

A stone tablet inside the church commemorates the well-known essayist and politician Sir Richard Steele. The organ was a gift from the Francis family, installed in 1951, and originally stood in the mansion at Deri Ormond, Betws Bledrws, Ceredigion.

The parish also has two nonconformist chapels - Babell which is Methodist and Philadelphia which is Independent.

Notable graves include those of poet Lewis Morris (1833 - 1907), hymn-writer David Charles and Sir Ewen Maclean.

Manor House
Bryntowy Mansion was built by William Bonville Junior in approximately 1850.

School 
Llangunnor boasts a dual stream mixed County Primary School for day pupils aged 3 to 11 years. The present school buildings were opened in 1961 and accommodate the Junior Department, Welsh Nursery
and English Infants.

The Nursery and Welsh Infant Departments are accommodated in a section built in 1980. The school is sited in semi-rural surroundings south of the town of Carmarthen, close to the River Tywi.

Governance 
Llangunnor Community Council is made of two wards (East & West) and represented by thirteen elected members. The Council meets on the third Thursday of every month (except in August) at 'Yr Aelwyd' and meeting are open to the general public.

The community is bordered by the communities of: Abergwili; Llanarthney; Llanddarog; Llangyndeyrn; Llandyfaelog; and Carmarthen, all being in Carmarthenshire.

Llangunnor is also the name of the county electoral ward to Carmarthenshire County Council. The ward is coterminous with the community. The ward is represented by one county councillor.

Development
In recent years major developments in the area have particularly affected Pensarn, a former residential area which saw many houses demolished in the early 1980s, to make way for the Southern bypass. The Belle Vue Hotel and the Square and Compass public house were also demolished. The area was affected with the building of the Eastern bypass.

The area has attracted major national retailers which have helped to establish Pensarn as a major out of town shopping district for the local populace in Carmarthen and the surrounding area. In September 2014 Domino's Pizza and Dunelm Mill opened stores in the area.

References

Further reading
Jones, Major Francis. (1986), Llangunnor, A Contribution.
Treharne, Cyril L. (1989), The History of Llangunnor Church, Llangunnor,

External links 
Llangunnor Network The definitive website regarding the history of Llangunnor along with preserving the history of Llangunnor extensive work is done with promoting Llangunnor
Llangunnor Community Council Website
Llangunnor Primary School Website
True Life in the Parish of Llangunnor (Facebook page)

Villages in Carmarthenshire
Communities in Carmarthenshire
Carmarthenshire electoral wards